Duncan Drew (born 11 November 1976) is a New Zealand cricketer. He played four first-class matches for Otago between 2000 and 2002.

Drew is a wicketkeeper-batsman who has worked as a physiotherapist. He has played Hawke Cup cricket for North Otago since 1994, and in January 2020 he became North Otago's highest run-scorer. In 2010 he scored 102 of the first innings total of 207 when North Otago won the Hawke Cup for the first time by beating Manawatu. In 2016 he again top-scored in the first innings, this time with 45, when North Otago beat Buller to win the Cup for the second time.

References

External links
 

1976 births
Living people
New Zealand cricketers
Otago cricketers
Cricketers from Oamaru